Cansu is a Turkish, most commonly female given name, and also a surname. It is composed of the words can (Iranic origin, meaning life, soul or spirit) and su (native Turkish, meaning water).

Given name
 Cansu Çetin (born 1993), Turkish volleyball player
 Cansu Dere (born 1980), Turkish model and actress
 Cansu Köksal (born 1994), Turkish basketball player
 Cansu Nur Kaya (born 2000), Turkish women's footballer
 Cansu Özbay (born 1996), Turkish volleyball player
Cansu Özdemir (born 1988), German politician of Turkish descent
 Cansu Tiryaki, Turkish football referee
 Cansu Yağ (born 1990), Turkish football player

Surname
 Büşra Cansu (born 1990), Turkish volleyball player

References

Turkish feminine given names